The 1925 Tipperary Senior Hurling Championship was the 34th staging of the Tipperary Senior Hurling Championship since its establishment by the Tipperary County Board in 1887.

Boherlahan won the championship after a 5–04 to 2–03 defeat of Toomevara/Moycarkey-Borris in the final. It was their seventh championship title overall and their second title in succession.

References

Tipperary
Tipperary Senior Hurling Championship